Mohammed Saidul Islam ndc, psc JSC SSC  is a Major General of the Bangladesh Army. He is currently a RCDS Course Member at the Royal College of Defence Studies (RCDS). Prior to that, he was the chairman of Sena Kalyan Sangstha.

Career 
Islam served as the Director General of the National Identity Registration Wing of the Election Commission. Islam also served as the Director of Identification System for Enhancing Access to Services Project, phrase two, of the National Identity Card of the Election Commission in 2020. He blocked the National Identity Cards of almost one thousand people for registering twice as voters.

On 21 March 2020, Islam inaugurated the shopping mall of Sena Kalyan Sangstha at Mohakhali DOHS.

References 

Living people
Bangladesh Army generals
Year of birth missing (living people)